The 2007 Fenland District Council election took place on 4 May 2007 to elect members of Fenland District Council in Cambridgeshire, England. The whole council was up for election and the Conservative Party stayed in overall control of the council.

Election result
The results saw the Conservatives strengthen their majority on the council after winning 39 of the 40 seats on the council. Only 13 of the 27 wards were contested, with Conservatives taking the seats in the other 14 wards without opposition. This meant the Conservatives had been guaranteed a majority even before voting, as 18 of their candidates were unopposed and another 4 were in multi seat wards were there were not enough candidates from other parties.

Labour lost the 3 seats they had been defending, 2 in Waterlees ward in Wisbech and 1 in March East.
What was remarkable, however, about the results was areas such as Waterlees ward, traditionally, had been part of larger wards (until the 2003 boundary changes) that were opposition strongholds.  Meanwhile, the Liberal Democrats failed to win any seats, but did come within 37 votes in Slade Lode ward in Chatteris. The only non-Conservative elected was independent Mark Archer, who gained Manea from Conservative Robert Sears by almost 200 votes, in a seat which Sears had won in a by-election in 2006.

Ward results

Ward results

References

2007 English local elections
2007
2000s in Cambridgeshire